The Marine Corps Cyber Auxiliary (also called the Cyber Aux) is a volunteer organization designed to attract cybersecurity experts in aiding United States Marine Corps cyberspace readiness.

History 
The Cyber Auxiliary was announced in April 2019. Some details regarding the organization have yet to be announced as of December 2019.

Leadership 
The Cyber Auxiliary is managed by  LtGen Matthew G. Glavy, the Marine Corps Deputy Commandant for Information.

Role 
The role of the Cyber Auxiliary is to "assist in simulated environments" with Marines; members are not authorized to carry out "hands-on cyber activities" (e.g. cyberwarfare or cybersecurity operations). Members of the Cyber Auxiliary will only be civilians or veterans, not members of the Marine Corps. However, they will serve to strengthen the Marine Corps' posture in the era of information warfare.

This effort should not be confuses with the new paid employee program "Cyber Force".

Requirements 
The requirements for the Cyber Auxiliary do not include military grooming, uniform, or physical fitness standards.  However, Cyber Auxiliary applications must:
 be a U.S. citizen
 have 3 years of work or academic experience in the cyber industry
 an industry leader or highly regarded in their field
 enthusiastic in volunteering for the Cyber Auxiliary
 not a current U.S. Government employee
 have an honorable discharge, if prior service

See also 
 Auxiliaries
 Civil Air Patrol
 Military Auxiliary Radio System
 United States Coast Guard Auxiliary
 United States Merchant Marine

References 

United States Marine Corps